Matthew Gregory (1693-1779) was a planter in Jamaica who sat in the House of Assembly of Jamaica for Saint James Parish in 1718 and 1722. He sat for Saint Ann in 1726.

A physician by profession, he also owned the Swansey Estate.

References 

Members of the House of Assembly of Jamaica
18th-century Jamaican physicians
1693 births
1779 deaths
Planters from the British West Indies
Saint James Parish, Jamaica